The International Association of Scientific, Technical and Medical Publishers, known for short by the initials for the last part of its name, STM, is an international trade association organised and run for the benefit of scholarly, scientific, technical, medical and professional publishers. It was conceived as the STM Group at the Frankfurt Book Fair of 1969 following discussions at the 1968 meeting of the International Publishers Association. It obtained its current name and was registered in Amsterdam as a foundation in 1994. 

The association currently has two offices, located in the Hague and in Oxford. As of 2015 it had over 100 members who publish more than 60% of the annually published journals literature and tens of thousands of monographs and references works. Its chief executive officer, Ian Moss, joined the organization in 2019, following the retirement of predecessor Michael Mabe (CEO 2006–2019).
STM (The International Association for Scientific, Technical and Medical Publishers) announced on 16 November 2021 that its Board has appointed Dr. Caroline Sutton as the organization’s new Chief Executive Officer. Caroline who previously serves as Director of Open Research for Taylor & Francis started the position in February 2022.

References

External links
 

Arts and media trade groups
Academic publishing
1994 establishments in the Netherlands
Organizations established in 1994